Reha Muhtar (born 21 July 1959) is a Turkish anchorman, columnist and television reporter of Iraqi Turkmen descent.

He was first seen on TV as TRT's reporter from Turkey, Istanbul. Later he started hosting a debate program at show tv "Ateş Hattı"  channel. Later, on the private channel Show TV as an anchorman, he gained national fame. His chaotic, no-holds-barred news making, remarks and most importantly the bizarre questions he asked his guests made him a phenomenon in Turkey. He is also famous for his pumpkin argument with news audiences on Show TV.

He has hosted a talk show on Show TV with other Turkish celebrities Hülya Avşar, he is currently working as a columnist for a Turkish newspaper, Vatan.

Personal life 
In 1983, he married journalist Selin Çağlayan and their marriage lasted for five years.
In 2001, he started a relationship with Nilüfer. In 2003, the two announced their separation in a press release.  
Between 2006 and 2007 his relationship with Gülşen made his name appear frequently in the media.
In 2008, he started a relationship with Deniz Uğur which ended in 2010.  
Reha Muhtar has a daughter with Nilüfer, adopted daughter Ayşe Nazlı. He has twins with Deniz Uğur, Mina and Poyraz born in 2009.

References

1959 births
Television people from Istanbul
Turkish broadcast news analysts
TED Ankara College Foundation Schools alumni
Living people
Turkish television journalists
Turkish television talk show hosts
Turkish columnists
Milliyet people
Vatan people